Pleradenophora membranifolia is a species of plant in the family Euphorbiaceae. It ranges from Peru to central Brazil.

Sebastiania huallagensis Croizat is treated as a synonym of P. membranifolia in Kew's Plants of the World Online database. The former, listed as endemic to Peru, was assessed as vulnerable on the IUCN Red List.

References

Hippomaneae
Flora of Peru
Taxonomy articles created by Polbot